Skipp Townsend, is a 58 year old American gang expert and former documented Bloods gang member for over 27 years from Los Angeles, California. Townsend was raised in South Los Angeles and through his early education, he attended a catholic school, Skipp Townsend, dropped out of high school (Dorsey High School) in his junior year. He was first arrested at the age of thirteen  Townsend is known for his role in several documentaries and movies: How to Make Money Selling Drugs, 'The '80s: The Decade That Made Us,: The '80s: The Decade That Made Us (TV Mini-Series (2013– ))], himself as former crack dealer</ref> Crips and Bloods: Made in America, ESPN's Series 30 for 30,IMDb: 30 for 30 (TV Series (2009–2016)), (1 episode, 2010)</ref> and Gangland episode: "One Blood". He also assisted the casting department in two episodes of T.I.'s Road to Redemption''. Not only is he known for documentaries and movies but also well known in minority communities and is normally the first one to arrive at a scene when shots get fired 

Townsend is the co-founder and executive director of 2nd Call, a gang intervention non-profit, and board member of the Southern California Cease Fire Committee. [Citation |last=Gillie |first=Nick |date=18 Sep 2013 |title=Cease Fire Interview: Skipp Townsend |work=The Huffington Post |  |access-date=27 Nov 2016 | quote=Founder and Executive Director of 2nd Call and an Execut   Townsend is often interviewed as a pragmatic expert regarding police-public relations and as an "interventionist" regarding community conflicts.
Under this non-profit organization, classes on domestic violence, parenting, anger management, and re-entry are provided in both Los Angeles and Pasadena. As well, 2nd Call helps to keep at-risk youth out of gangs. Moreover, Townsend helps former offenders find jobs in construction or electrical work once they have completed the program  2nd Call works with activists and acts as a liaison between citizens and law enforcement and pushes for systematic changes in policing. As well, he suggests for officers to address mental health and substance abuse. Having more community policing, law enforcement engaging with their communities more as well as understand any pain they may be feeling that is related to the involvement of police officers.
In 2020, Townsend supported 100 formerly incarcerated individuals who helped build the SoFi stadium, and additionally during the pandemic, USC partners with 2nd Call to help distribute supplies for community members as many can not afford to buy masks.

In 2005  2nd Call was founded by Skipp Townsend. 2nd Call is a community-based organization designed to save lives by reducing violence and assisting in the personal development of high-risk individuals, proven offenders, ex-felons, parolees, and others with society disregard. Moreover, 2nd Call provides an alternative to violence and abuse through intervention, counseling and support. As well, the organization provides a series of classes aiming to promote positive growth as well as post-release mentorship. Additionally, 2nd Call is the only organization to provide free quarter-proof classes and provides 9 trauma classes in Los Angeles. Furthermore, this organization allows judges to send individuals to 2nd Call classes rather than to jail. Lastly, this organization offers Union Careers to assist in rebuilding Los Angeles (Electrician and construction). From these programs, 2nd Call brought youth together and has changed the lives of nearly 2,000-3,000 individuals.

References

External links 
 2nd Call
 Southern California Cease Fire Committee

Living people
People from Los Angeles
Former gang members
American documentary filmmakers
American community activists
Activists from California
Bloods
Year of birth missing (living people)